This is a list of Arab countries and territories by population.

Present

Past and Future

Notes

See also
Demographics of the Arab League
List of African countries by population
List of countries in the Americas by population
List of Asian countries by population
List of Caribbean island countries by population
List of Eurasian countries by population
List of European countries by population
List of European Union member states by population
List of largest cities in the Arab world
List of Latin American countries by population
List of member states of the Commonwealth of Nations by population
List of Middle East countries by population
List of North American countries by population
List of Oceanian countries by population
List of South American countries by population
List of countries by past and future population
List of countries by population in 2000
List of countries by population in 2010

References

Countries by population
Arab
Arab
Arab world
Africa
Eurasia